Scott Hill may refer to:

Scott Hill (musician), American rock musician
Scotti Hill (born 1964), guitarist for American rock band Skid Row
Scott Hill (rugby league) (born 1977), Australian rugby league footballer
Petticoat Hill, also known as Scott Hill, a hill that rises above Williamsburg, Massachusetts
Scott Hill (Elkins, West Virginia), a historic home located near Elkins in Randolph County, West Virginia, United States

Hill, Scott